Xolani Nkuleko Msimango is a South African politician who has been a Member of the National Assembly of South Africa for the African National Congress since March 2022. He is a member of the Portfolio Committee on Cooperative Governance and Traditional Affairs.

Msimango was appointed to the National Assembly to replace Maggie Tlou, who died in February 2022.

References

Living people
Zulu people
African National Congress politicians
Members of the National Assembly of South Africa
Year of birth missing (living people)